The 2013 Mersin Cup was a professional tennis tournament played on clay courts. It was the second edition of the tournament which was part of the 2013 ATP Challenger Tour. It took place in Mersin, Turkey between 8 and 14 April 2013.

Singles main draw entrants

Seeds

 1 Rankings are as of April 1, 2013.

Other entrants
The following players received wildcards into the singles main draw:
  Tuna Altuna
  Cem İlkel
  Barkın Yalçınkale
  Anıl Yüksel

The following players received entry from the qualifying draw:
  Marcin Gawron
  Michael Linzer
  Jaroslav Pospíšil
  Marc Sieber

Doubles main draw entrants

Seeds

1 Rankings as of April 1, 2013.

Other entrants
The following pairs received wildcards into the doubles main draw:
  Haluk Akkoyun /  Marsel İlhan
  Durukan Durmuş /  Anıl Yüksel
  Cem İlkel /  Efe Yurtaçan

The following pair received entry using a protected ranking:
  Andreas Beck /  Dominik Meffert

The following pair received entry as an alternate:
  Tuna Altuna /  Michael Linzer

Champions

Singles

 Jiří Veselý def.  Simon Greul, 6–1, 6–1

Doubles

 Andreas Beck /  Dominik Meffert def.  Radu Albot /  Oleksandr Nedovyesov, 5–7, 6–3, [10–8]

External links
Official Website

Mersin Cup
Mersin Cup